Julian Günther-Schmidt (born 13 September 1994) is a German professional footballer who plays as a forward for  club 1. FC Saarbrücken.

Career
Born in Pforzheim, Germany, Günther-Schmidt played for youth teams of Waldhof Mannheim and Karlsruher SC. Having completed his Abitur, he moved to the youth academy of FC Ingolstadt. At Ingolstadt, he mostly featured in matches of the club's reserves and made one substitute appearance in the 2. Bundesliga against VfL Bochum in November 2014.

In September 2015, Günther-Schmidt signed with FC Augsburg. Having scored 8 goals in 12 matches for the reserves in the Regionalliga he made his Bundesliga debut on 23 October 2016 against SC Freiburg.

Career statistics

References

External links
 

Living people
1994 births
Sportspeople from Pforzheim
Association football forwards
German footballers
FC Ingolstadt 04 II players
FC Ingolstadt 04 players
FC Augsburg II players
FC Augsburg players
FC Carl Zeiss Jena players
SC Fortuna Köln players
1. FC Saarbrücken players
Regionalliga players
2. Bundesliga players
Bundesliga players
3. Liga players
Footballers from Baden-Württemberg
21st-century German people